Great Galloping Gottschalk is a contemporary ballet with choreography by Lynne Taylor-Corbett, set to the music of American composer Louis Moreau Gottschalk. It premiered with the American Ballet Theatre (ABT) at the Miami Beach Theater of the Performing Arts on 12 January 1982.

Music 
The music, reminiscent of ragtime, consists of the following six selections from Gottschalk's piano works, orchestrated by Jack Elliott:
 Souvenir de Porto Rico
 The Dying Poet
 Tournament Galop
 La Savane and Oh ma charmante, épargnez-moi!
 Le Bananier
 Manchega

Productions 
Since its ABT premiere, Great Galloping Gottschalk has been staged by numerous ballet companies, including the Pennsylvania Ballet,
Carolina Ballet, 
BalletMet Columbus,
Kansas City Ballet,
and Pittsburgh Ballet Theatre.

References 

Ballets by Lynne Taylor-Corbett
Ballets to the music of Louis Moreau Gottschalk
1982 ballet premieres